Hause is a surname. Notable people with the surname include:

Dave Hause (born 1978), American singer-songwriter
Evan Hause (born 1967), American composer, percussionist and conductor
Kortney Hause (born 1995), English footballer
Lothar Hause (born 1955), East German footballer
David Hause (born 1968), American Pharmaceutical Development Consultant, explorer